Francis Joseph Flynn (6 October 1864 – 5 October 1898), better known as General Mite, was an American dwarf who performed as a showman at various competitions around the world.

Flynn was born on 6 October 1864 in Greene, New York, the son of Edward Finnion Flynn and Mary Ann Flynn and brother to Alice Flynn. They were of average height.

In 1884, Flynn married an English dwarf, Millie Edwards, in England. The wedding was widely publicized and attended. From then on, the couple were exhibited as the "Royal American Midgets" and "General and Mrs. Mite" in many advertisements.

In 1890, Flynn and Edwards moved to Australia. Flynn died in Broken Hill, New South Wales on 5 October 1898, one day before his 34th birthday.

References

External links 

Article: General Mite is Honored in Australia at Town of Greene, New York's website
Millie Edwards and Francis Flynn at the National Library of Australia

1864 births
1898 deaths
American entertainers
American expatriates in Australia
People from Greene, New York
Entertainers with dwarfism
Sideshow performers